Zafrona is a genus of sea snails, marine gastropod mollusks in the family Columbellidae, the dove snails.

Species
Species within the genus Zafrona include:
 Zafrona azteci K. Monsecour & D. Monsecour, 2016
 Zafrona dicomata (Dall, 1889)
 Zafrona diversa Espinosa, Ortea & Fernadez-Garcés, 2007
 Zafrona fatuhiva K. Monsecour & D. Monsecour, 2018
 Zafrona incerta (Stearns, 1892)
 Zafrona isomella (Duclos, 1840)
 Zafrona kilburni Bozzetti, 2009
 Zafrona lightfooti (Smith, 1901)
 Zafrona lindae Petuch, 1992
 Zafrona macronata Simone, 2009
 Zafrona pleuriferoides K. Monsecour & D. Monsecour, 2018
 Zafrona pulchella (Blainville, 1829)
 Zafrona samadiae K. Monsecour & D. Monsecour, 2016
 Zafrona somalica Bozzetti, 2007
 Zafrona striatula (Dunker, 1871)
 Zafrona subfelina (Hervier, 1899)
 Zafrona sunderlandi Petuch, 1987
 Zafrona taylorae Petuch, 1987
 Zafrona tortugana Garcia, 2015
 Zafrona trifilosa (E.A. Smith, 1882)
 Zafrona ursula (Thiele, 1925)
Species brought into synonymy
 Zafrona belkisae Espinosa, Ortea, Fernandez-Garcés & Moro, 2007: synonym of Falsuszafrona belkisae (Espinosa & Ortea, 2007)
 Zafrona consobrinella Rehder, 1980: synonym of Zafrona striatula (Dunker, 1871)
 Zafrona decussata Lussi, 2002 synonym of Retizafra decussata (Lussi, 2002)
 Zafrona idalina (Duclos, 1840): synonym of Falsuszafrona idalina (Duclos, 1840)

References

 Vaught, K.C. (1989). A classification of the living Mollusca. American Malacologists: Melbourne, FL (USA). . XII, 195 pp

External links
- Iredale T. (1916). On some new and old molluscan names. Proceedings of the Malacological Society of London. 12(1): 27-37

Columbellidae